Tai Leng Tung is a hill in Hong Kong.

See also 
 List of mountains, peaks and hills in Hong Kong
 Tai Wan Tau, a village located at the base of the hill in its south

References 

Sai Kung District